Acacia enervia is a shrub or tree of the genus Acacia and the subgenus Plurinerves that is endemic to an area of south western Australia.

Description
Like most species of Acacia it has phyllodes rather than true leaves. It blooms from August to October and produces yellow flowers.

Taxonomy
It is most closely related to Acacia lineolata and Acacia inceana which all belong to the Acacia enervia group of wattles.
There are two recognised subspecies:
Acacia enervia subsp. enervia
Acacia enervia subsp. explicata

Distribution
It is native to an area in the Wheatbelt and Goldfields-Esperance regions of Western Australia where it is commonly situated in salt marshes, flats and lakes and rocky hills usually growing in sandy or loamy soils and rarely in clay soils. The distribution of the plant extends from Jibberding in the north west to around Lake Grace and Lake Magenta in the south east out to around Clear Streak Well in the east.

See also
List of Acacia species

References

enervia
Acacias of Western Australia
Taxa named by Joseph Maiden
Taxa named by William Blakely
Plants described in 1928